Landåsbygda Church is a parish church of the Church of Norway in Søndre Land Municipality in Innlandet county, Norway. It is located in the village of Landåsbygda. It is one of the churches for the Fluberg parish which is part of the Hadeland og Land prosti (deanery) in the Diocese of Hamar. The brown, wooden church was built in a long church design in 1965 using plans drawn up by the architect Per Nordan. The church seats about 190 people.

History
During the early 1960s, planning began for an annex chapel for the northern parts of Søndre Land. The new chapel would be subordinate to the main Fluberg Church. The parish hired Per Nordan to design the new wooden building. It has a long church design, but the whole building is shaped like an elongated octagon. The new building was completed and consecrated in 1965. Around the turn of the 21st century, the chapel was re-titled as a church within the Fluberg parish.

Media gallery

See also
List of churches in Hamar

References

Søndre Land
Churches in Innlandet
Long churches in Norway
Wooden churches in Norway
20th-century Church of Norway church buildings
Churches completed in 1965
1965 establishments in Norway